John Hanson Farquhar (December 20, 1818 – October 1, 1873) was an American lawyer and politician who served one term as a U.S. Representative from Indiana from 1865 to 1867.

Early years 
Born in Union Bridge, Maryland, Farquhar attended the public schools.
He moved to Indiana with his parents, who settled in Richmond in 1833.
He was employed as an assistant engineer on the White River Canal until 1840.
He studied law.

Career 
He was then  admitted to the bar where he commenced practice in Brookville, Indiana.
He was also the Secretary of the State senate in 1842 and 1843.
Chief clerk of the State house of representatives in 1844.
He was an unsuccessful candidate for election in 1852 to the Thirty-third Congress.
He served as captain in the Nineteenth Infantry of the Regular Army in the Civil War.

Farquhar was elected as a Republican to the Thirty-ninth Congress (March 4, 1865 – March 3, 1867).
He was not a candidate for renomination in 1866.
He moved to Indianapolis in 1870 and engaged in banking.
He was appointed secretary of state by Gov. Conrad Baker.

Death 
He died in Indianapolis, Indiana, October 1, 1873.
He was interred in Crown Hill Cemetery.

References

1818 births
1873 deaths
Burials at Crown Hill Cemetery
Secretaries of State of Indiana
People of Indiana in the American Civil War
Union Army officers
People from Union Bridge, Maryland
19th-century American politicians
Republican Party members of the United States House of Representatives from Indiana